Don Gilét (born 17 January 1967) is an English actor, best known for his roles in BBC productions Babyfather, EastEnders and 55 Degrees North.

Personal life
He was brought up in Caldmore, Walsall, with two older sisters. He attended Blue Coat Academy Church of England and Sunday school at Caldmore Gospel Hall in Caldmore, and the Mountview Academy of Theatre Arts. He currently resides with his family in Bedfordshire. Gilét is close friends with EastEnders co-star Diane Parish, both having been in Babyfather together.

Career
Gilét's first television appearance was on the Channel 4 dating show Streetmate, where he was interviewed as the friend of a participant. His first major role was playing Johnny Lindo in Babyfather (opposite future EastEnders co-star Diane Parish), before landing the lead role in the detective series 55 Degrees North, as Detective Sergeant Nicky Cole. In 2006, he played Leo Charles in The Line of Beauty and had a prominent role in the Doctor Who Christmas episode "The Runaway Bride". He often performs his own stunts on set.

In 2001, Gilét appeared in a commercial for Apple's iMac G4 Computer. The commercial was named "Window Shopping" and displayed Gilét making certain gestures towards the iMac, which the computer later copied. He also appeared as a store manager in a staff training video for Sainsbury's supermarkets.
He has had minor appearances in Casualty, Holby City, Silent Witness and The Bill.

Gilét featured in the music video for Gabrielle's 2001 hit "Out of Reach". In 2011, he featured in a music video for the song 'I Want You to Remember' by solo artist I Am Spartacus.

In theatre, he has appeared in As You Like It and The Alchemist.

In April 2008, he joined the popular BBC television soap opera EastEnders playing serial killer Lucas Johnson. Gilét's character left EastEnders on 30 July 2010.

In 2010, he appeared as Abanazar in the Churchill Theatre Bromley's Christmas pantomime Aladdin alongside Melinda Messenger. He followed up this performance in 2011 by appearing at the Grove Theatre, Dunstable in Jack and the Beanstalk, which also featured his EastEnders co-star Gemma Bissix.

In May 2013, Gilét played the roles of Fuliginous, Ruislip & Blackfriar in a BBC radio adaptation of Neil Gaiman's Neverwhere, adapted by Dirk Maggs.

In 2014, Gilét joined the cast of BBC medical drama Holby City in the role of Consultant Anaesthetist Jesse Law.

In 2015, Gilét re-joined the cast of BBC soap opera EastEnders to reprise his role of Lucas Johnson. The first episode that Gilét was featured in was aired on 1 January 2016. His character returned later that year, when his character returned to his villainous way by trying to escape from prison. Gilét's character departed the show again on 10 March 2016. In 2017, Gilét joined the TV series The Loch, playing psychologist Blake Albrighton. The character made his debut in the series's first episode on 11 June 2017.

In 2020, it was announced that Gilét was set to return to the BBC soap opera, EastEnders to reprise his role of Lucas Johnson. The character returned on 25 December 2020 and departed on 18 March 2021. Then in 2022, he portrayed the role of Coach Harris in the BBC series Rebel Cheer Squad.

Filmography

Desmond's (1993)
The Imaginatively Titled Punt & Dennis Show (1994)
Now What (1995)
Brothers and Sisters (1998)
The Return of Nick Cotton (2000) – Biscuit
Casualty (2001)
Babyfather (2001)
Holby City (2002)
Time Gentlemen Please (2002)
Cutting It (2002)
Single Voices (2002)
Silent Witness (2003)
The Bill (2003)
Belly Button (2004)
55 Degrees North (2004–2005)
The Line of Beauty (2006)
Doctor Who: "The Runaway Bride" (Christmas special, 2006)
Cape Wrath (2007)
EastEnders (2008–2010, 2016, 2020–2021) – Lucas Johnson
EastEnders: E20 (2010) – Lucas Johnson
Wizards vs Aliens (2012) – Richard Sherwood
Father Brown (2013) – Douglas Taylor
What Does the K Stand For? (2013) – Vincent Amos (radio comedy)
Holby City – Jesse Law (2014–2016)
Death in Paradise (2015) – Guest appearance
Brief Encounters (2016) – Kieren
The Loch (2017) – Blake Albrighton
Death on the Tyne  (2018) – Alan
Scarborough (2019) – Joe Cassidy
The Stranger (2019) – Phillip
Shakespeare & Hathaway: Private Investigators (2020) – Winston Hoyte
Rebel Cheer Squad (2022) – Coach Harris

Awards and nominations

References

External links
 

1967 births
Living people
People from Walsall
Alumni of the Mountview Academy of Theatre Arts
Black British male actors
British male stage actors
British male soap opera actors
20th-century British male actors
21st-century British male actors
English people of Nigerian descent